{{DISPLAYTITLE:C19H30O5S}}
The molecular formula C19H30O5S (molar mass: 370.50 g/mol, exact mass: 370.1814 u) may refer to:

 Androstenediol sulfate
 Androsterone sulfate

Molecular formulas